Francesco Martino may refer to:

 Francesco Martino (politician) (1937–2017), Italian politician and professor
 Francesco Martino (gymnast) (1900–1965), Italian gymnast and Olympic champion

See also
 Francesco De Martino (1907–2002), Italian jurist and politician